Mary Sattler Peltola (née Sattler; Yup'ik: Akalleq; formerly Nelson, formerly Kapsner; born August 31, 1973) is an American politician and former tribal judge serving as the U.S. representative from  since September 2022. She previously served as a judge on the Orutsararmiut Native Council's tribal court, executive director of the Kuskokwim River Inter-Tribal Fish Commission, Bethel city councillor and member of the Alaska House of Representatives.

A member of the Democratic Party, Peltola defeated former Governor Sarah Palin and Alaska Policy Forum board member Nick Begich in an upset in the August 2022 special election to succeed Don Young, who died in March that year. In doing so, she became the first Alaska Native member of Congress and the only Russian Orthodox, as well as the first woman ever to represent Alaska in the House, and first Democrat since Nick Begich Sr. in 1972. She was reelected to a full term in the regularly scheduled election in November 2022.

Early life and education 
Peltola is Yup'ik from Western Alaska. She was born in Anchorage, Alaska, on August 31, 1973. Her father, Ward Sattler, a German-American from Nebraska, moved to Alaska to work as a pilot and teacher. Her mother, Elizabeth "LizAnn" Piicigaq Williams, is Yup'ik from Kwethluk. Peltola was raised in the communities of Kwethluk, Tuntutuliak, Platinum, and Bethel. As a child, she traveled with her father around Alaska as he campaigned for Congressman Don Young. As a college student, she worked as a herring and salmon technician for the Alaska Department of Fish and Game. Peltola studied elementary education at the University of Northern Colorado (1991 to 1993) and later took courses at the University of Alaska Fairbanks (1994 to 1995), University of Alaska Southeast (1995 to 1997), and University of Alaska Anchorage (1997 to 1998).

In 1995, Peltola won the Miss National Congress of American Indians pageant. In the competition, she performed two Yup'ik dances and wore traditional clothing including a squirrel skin parka, wolf hair headdress, and mukluks.

Career

Alaska House of Representatives (1999–2009)

In 1996, Peltola was an Alaska Legislature intern. Later that year, she ran for a Bethel region seat, losing to incumbent Ivan Ivan by 56 votes. Peltola worked as the campaign manager for Ivan's challenger, Independent candidate Willie Kasayulie, in the general election. Later, she was a reporter.

In 1998, Peltola was elected to the Alaska House of Representatives, after a successful rematch against Ivan in the Democratic primary. She appeared on the ballot under her maiden name, though she was married to Jonathan Kapsner at the time. She was elected and reelected mostly without or with only minimal opposition, with Ivan's return to challenge her in the 2002 primary the closest contest she faced.

In the House, Peltola served on various standing committees, including Finance, Resources and Health and Social Services. She helped to rebuild the Bush Caucus, a bipartisan group of representatives and senators who represent rural and off-road communities in Alaska.

Later career (2009–2022)
Peltola worked as manager of community development and sustainability for the Donlin Creek Mine from 2008 to 2014. In 2010, after incumbent Republican U.S. Senator Lisa Murkowski lost her party's primary, Peltola helped run her successful write-in campaign. Peltola was elected to the Bethel City Council in 2011, and served until her term ended in 2013. She was a lobbyist in Alaska from 2015 to 2017. After 2016, Peltola served as executive director of the Kuskokwim River Inter-Tribal Fish Commission. From 2020 to 2021, she served as a judge on the Orutsararmiut Native Council's tribal court.

U.S. House of Representatives (2022–present)

Elections

2022 special 

Peltola was one of the three candidates to progress to the general election of the 50 who ran in 2022 Alaska's at-large congressional district special election primary to succeed Don Young, and thereby become the fifth representative from Alaska in the U.S. House since statehood. She advanced to the runoff in fourth place, the only Democrat to do so. Al Gross, an independent in third place in the primary, dropped out of the ranked choice runoff, leaving two Republicans remaining, former governor Sarah Palin and Nick Begich III. Gross endorsed Peltola after dropping out of the race. Three Alaska voters filed a losing suit to challenge the decision not to allow Republican Tara Sweeney, the fifth placer in the primary, to advance to the runoff. Sweeney subsequently withdrew her candidacy. Peltola defeated Palin and Begich in the ranked-choice runoff tabulation.

2022 
Peltola sought a full term in the 2022 general election. She advanced to the general election in first place, receiving 36.8% of the votes in the primary. Alaska Republican Lisa Murkowski, running for her fourth term in the U.S. Senate, told Alaska Federation of Natives Convention delegates that she intended to vote for Peltola as her top choice in the 2022 election. Murkowski said: "I do not toe the party line just because party leaders have asked... My first obligation is to the people of the state of Alaska."

Ahead of the November 2022 election, Peltola announced endorsements from Don Young's daughters, Joni Nelson and Dawn Vallely, in addition to Young's former communications director Zack Brown. Various other friends and former staff of Young endorsed Peltola in a formal endorsement letter. Peltola, who received just under 49% of the vote in initial balloting, was declared the winner on November 23, defeating Palin again with 55% of the ranked-choice vote, after those votes cast for her as the second-place choice on ballots of the eliminated third-place candidate, Nick Begich III, were added to her total.

Tenure 

Peltola was sworn in as Alaska's U.S. representative on September 13, 2022. Upon her swearing in, Congress had an Alaska Native (Peltola), Native Americans (Sharice Davids, Yvette Herrell, Markwayne Mullin, and Tom Cole), and a Native Hawaiian (Kai Kahele) serving simultaneously for the first time ever. She is the fourth Native woman elected to Congress, after Davids, Herrell, and Deb Haaland.

On September 29, 2022, Peltola passed her first bill through the House. The bill would create an Office of Food Security in the Department of Veterans Affairs. Peltola remarked that veterans comprise about 10% of Alaska's population and many of them suffer from food insecurity. Peltola's bill passed the House in a 376–49 vote.

During the 2022 United States railroad labor dispute, Peltola was one of eight House Democrats to vote against a bill that would impose a new contract on railroad workers despite several rail unions voting against it. She said she could not support a contract that did not include paid sick days: "It just seems like a human right, a quality of life issue, to be able to see a doctor, to be able to take a sick day and know that you're not going to lose your job or be severely penalized."

Peltola supports allowing ConocoPhillips to drill for oil in the so-called Willow project, and urged the White House and the Interior Department to approve the project, which they did.

In February 2023, Peltola announced that she had chosen Josh Revak, a former Republican state senator who ran against her in the 2022 special election, to run her Alaska office. Several of Peltola's congressional staffers are Republicans, including her chief of staff, Alex Ortiz, who was chief of staff to her predecessor Don Young.

Political positions

COVID-19 policy
On January 31, 2023, Peltola voted against H.R.497:Freedom for Health Care Workers Act, a bill which would lift COVID-19 vaccine mandates for healthcare workers.

On February 1, 2023, Peltola voted against a resolution to end COVID-19 national emergency.

Syria
In 2023, Peltola voted against H.Con.Res. 21, which directed President Joe Biden to remove U.S. troops from Syria within 180 days.

Voting rights
On February 9, 2023, Peltola voted against H.J.Res. 24: Disapproving the action of the District of Columbia Council in approving the Local Resident Voting Rights Amendment Act of 2022, which condemns the District of Columbia’s plan to allow non-citizens to vote in local elections.

Committee assignments 
 Committee on Education and Labor
 Committee on Natural Resources
 Committee on Transportation and Infrastructure

Caucus memberships
Blue Dog Coalition

Personal life 
Peltola is the first U.S. Representative from Alaska born in the state. She now resides in Bethel with her husband Gene Peltola, Alaska director for the Bureau of Indian Affairs. She has four children and three stepchildren. An Alaska Native, Peltola is a tribal member of the Orutsararmiut Native Council. She is a member of the Russian Orthodox Church in Alaska.

Electoral history

See also 
 List of Native American jurists
 List of Native Americans in the United States Congress
 Women in the United States House of Representatives

References

External links 

 Representative Mary Sattler Peltola official U.S. House website
 Mary Peltola for Alaska campaign website

|-

|-

|-

|-

1973 births
20th-century American women politicians
20th-century American politicians
20th-century Native American politicians
21st-century American judges
21st-century American women politicians
21st-century Native American politicians
Alaska city council members
American lobbyists
Christians from Alaska
Democratic Party members of the United States House of Representatives from Alaska
Female members of the United States House of Representatives
Living people
Democratic Party members of the Alaska House of Representatives
Members of the Orthodox Church in America
Native American Christians
Native American judges
American people of German descent
Native American members of the United States Congress
Native American state legislators in Alaska
Native American women in politics
People from Bethel, Alaska
Politicians from Anchorage, Alaska
Russian Orthodox Christians from the United States
Women city councillors in Alaska
Women state legislators in Alaska
Yupik people
20th-century Native American women
21st-century Native American women
21st-century American women judges
Beauty queen-politicians
21st-century American politicians
Eastern Orthodox Christians from the United States